The following are the national records in athletics in Mexico maintained by its national athletics federation: Federación Mexicana de Asociaciones de Atletismo (FMAA).

Outdoor

+ = en route to a longer distance

h = hand timing

NWI = no wind measurement

A = affected by altitude

a = aided road course according to IAAF rule 260.28

OT = oversized track (> 200m in circumference)

Men

Women

Indoor

Men

Women

Notes

References
General
World Athletics Statistic Handbook 2022: National Outdoor Records
World Athletics Statistic Handbook 2022: National Indoor Records
Specific

External links
 FMAA web site

Mexico
Records
Athletics
Athletics